Juozas Kamarauskas  (1874–1946) was a Lithuanian painter.

See also
List of Lithuanian painters

References
Universal Lithuanian Encyclopedia

External link

1874 births
1946 deaths
People from Širvintos District Municipality
People from Kovno Governorate
20th-century Lithuanian painters
Burials at Antakalnis Cemetery